Schad v. Arizona, 501 U.S. 624 (1991), is a United States Supreme Court decision that explained which charges need to be explained to the jury in trials for felony murders.

See also
 List of United States Supreme Court cases, volume 501
 List of United States Supreme Court cases
 Lists of United States Supreme Court cases by volume
 List of United States Supreme Court cases by the Rehnquist Court

External links
 
 
  Case profile from the Arizona Department of Corrections
  Capital Defense Network's Introduction to the Eighth Amendment

1991 in United States case law
United States murder case law
United States Supreme Court cases
United States Supreme Court cases of the Rehnquist Court
1991 in Arizona
Legal history of Arizona